Milton is a city in King and Pierce counties in the U.S. state of Washington. The population was 8,697 at the time of the 2020 census. Milton borders the larger but newer town of Edgewood.

Geography
Milton is located in northern Pierce County and southern King County at  (47.248208, -122.317376).

The Milton and Edgewood areas are known informally as North Hill. This contrasts with the South Hill area on the opposite side of the Puyallup River valley.

Climate
This region experiences warm (but not hot) and dry summers, with no average monthly temperatures above . According to the Köppen Climate Classification system, Milton has a warm-summer Mediterranean climate, abbreviated "Csb" on climate maps.

Demographics

2010 census
As of the census of 2010, there were 6,968 people, 2,901 households, and 1,834 families living in the city. The racial makeup of the city was 82.9% White, 3.1% African American, 1.2% Native American, 5.1% Asian, 0.8% Pacific Islander, 1.7% from other races, and 5.2% from two or more races. Hispanic or Latino of any race were 5.4% of the population.

There were 2,901 households, of which 33.1% had children under the age of 18 living with them, 44.5% were married couples living together, 13.5% had a female householder with no husband present, 5.2% had a male householder with no wife present, and 36.8% were non-families. 28.3% of all households were made up of individuals, and 10.3% had someone living alone who was 65 years of age or older. The average household size was 2.40 and the average family size was 2.95.

The median age in the city was 36.7 years. 23.4% of residents were under the age of 18; 9.3% were between the ages of 18 and 24; 28.9% were from 25 to 44; 26.5% were from 45 to 64; and 12% were 65 years of age or older. The gender makeup of the city was 47.7% male and 52.3% female.

2000 census
As of the census of 2000, there were 5,795 people, 2,390 households, and 1,563 families living in the city. The population density was 2,291.3 people per square mile (884.4/km2). There were 2,503 housing units at an average density of 989.7 per square mile (382.0/km2). The racial makeup of the city was 90.34% White, 1.14% African American, 1.17% Native American, 2.83% Asian, 0.28% Pacific Islander, 0.79% from other races, and 3.45% from two or more races. Hispanic or Latino of any race were 3.55% of the population.

There were 2,390 households, out of which 31.2% had children under the age of 18 living with them, 49.7% were married couples living together, 11.3% had a female householder with no husband present, and 34.6% were non-families. 28.0% of all households were made up of individuals, and 10.1% had someone living alone who was 65 years of age or older. The average household size was 2.39 and the average family size was 2.92.

In the city, the population was spread out, with 24.8% under the age of 18, 7.3% from 18 to 24, 31.7% from 25 to 44, 22.3% from 45 to 64, and 13.9% who were 65 years of age or older. The median age was 38 years. For every 100 females, there were 93.6 males. For every 100 women age 18 and over, there were 91.5 men.

The median income for a household in the city was $48,166, and the median income for a family was $64,105. Males had a median income of $41,508 versus $30,111 for females. The per capita income for the city was $22,400. About 4.8% of families and 8.0% of the population were below the poverty line, including 12.2% of those under age 18 and 7.4% of those age 65 or over.

Education

Most of Milton, including all of the Pierce County portion, is served by Fife Public Schools. Other parts of the King County portion are in the Federal Way School District.

Notable people
 Katrina Asay, state legislator
 Kenneth Simmons, state legislator and local politician

See also
 Surprise Lake (Washington)

References

External links
 Official website

Cities in King County, Washington
Cities in Pierce County, Washington
Cities in the Seattle metropolitan area
Cities in Washington (state)